Mystic Chords of Memory is an American alternative rock duo consisting of Christopher Gunst of Beachwood Sparks and Jen Cohen of The Aislers Set.

History
Mystic Chords of Memory released their self-titled debut album, Mystic Chords of Memory, on Rough Trade Records in 2004.

The band also released Tree Colored See, a collaborative album with Nobody, on Mush Records in 2006.

Name
The phrase mystic chords of memory appears in the last paragraph of Abraham Lincoln's first inaugural address.

Discography

Albums
 Mystic Chords of Memory (2004)
 Tree Colored See (2006) with Nobody

Singles
 "Broaden a New Sound" (2006) with Nobody

References

External links
 Mystic Chords of Memory on Mush Records
 

American alternative rock groups
American musical duos
Rough Trade Records artists